Yiğit is a Turkish name that can be translated as "valiant", "a person of exceptional bravery and strength". Notable people with the name include:

Given name
 Pasha Yiğit Bey (died 1413), Ottoman civil and military officer
 Yiğit Aslan (born 2004), Turkish swimmer
 Yiğit Caner Aydın (born 1992), Turkish para archer
 Yiğit Bulut (born 1972), Turkish journalist
 Yiğit Gökoğlan (born 1989), Turkish footballer
 Yiğit İncedemir (born 1985), Turkish footballer
 Yiğit Özşener (born 1972), Turkish actor

Surname
 Anthony Yiğit (born 1991), Swedish boxer 
Eşref Uğur Yiğit (born 1945), Turkish admiral and commander-in-chief of the Turkish Navy 
 Faruk Yiğit (born 1968), Turkish footballer
 Hasan Yiğit (born 1975), Turkish footballer
 Korkmaz Yiğit (born 1943), Turkish businessman 
 Neslihan Yiğit (born 1994), Turkish female badminton player
 Nilay Yiğit (born 1979), Turkish female basketball player
 Tamer Yiğit (born 1942), Turkish actor

Turkish-language surnames
Turkish masculine given names